Riddley Walker is a science fiction novel by American writer Russell Hoban, first published in 1980. It won the John W. Campbell Memorial Award for best science fiction novel in 1982, as well as an Australian Science Fiction Achievement Award in 1983. It was nominated for the Nebula Award for Best Novel in 1981.

It is Hoban's best-known adult novel and a drastic departure from his other work, although he continued to explore some of the same themes in other settings.

Production 
Hoban began work on the novel in 1974, inspired by the medieval wall painting of the legend of Saint Eustace at Canterbury Cathedral.

The novel is written in a stylistic, imaginary dialect based on and inspired by the dialect of Kent.

Plot 
Roughly two thousand years after a nuclear war has devastated civilization, Riddley, the young narrator, stumbles upon efforts to recreate a weapon of the ancient world.

The novel's characters live a harsh life in a small area which is presently the English county of Kent, and know little of the world outside of "Inland" (England). Their level of civilization is similar to England's prehistoric Iron Age, although they do not produce their own iron but salvage it from ancient machinery. Church and state have combined into one secretive institution, whose mythology, based on misinterpreted stories of the war and an old Catholic saint (Eustace), is enacted in puppet shows.

Critical reception 

Peter Ruppert noted that Hoban's novel draws on "such well-known dystopias as A Clockwork Orange, Lord of the Flies, and A Canticle for Leibowitz", and "what is unique in Hoban's haunting vision of the future is his language" which is described as being similar to the Nadsat slang spoken in Anthony Burgess' A Clockwork Orange. The Bulletin of the Atomic Scientists stated that, "The force and beauty and awfulness of Hoban's creation is shattering," and praised the author's use of a crude "Chaucerian English". John Mullan of The Guardian also praised Hoban's decision to narrate the novel in a devolved form of English: "The struggle with Riddley's language is what makes reading the book so absorbing, so completely possessing."

Library Journal wrote that the book holds "a unique and beloved place among the few after-Armageddon classics". It was included in David Pringle's book Science Fiction: The 100 Best Novels. In 1994, American literary critic Harold Bloom included Riddley Walker in his list of works comprising the Western Canon.

Adaptations

Film and theater 
 Robert C. Cumbow wrote in Slant Magazine that the post-apocalyptic film Mad Max Beyond Thunderdome borrowed "whole ideas, themes and characterizations" from the novel.
 Hoban's own theatrical adaptation premiered at the Royal Exchange Theatre, Manchester, in February 1986. It was directed by Braham Murray and starred David Threlfall. Its U.S. premiere was at the Chocolate Bayou Theatre, in April 1987, directed by Greg Roach.
 In 1989, Russell Hoban gave permission for theatre students at Sir Percival Whitley/Calderdale College, Halifax, West Yorkshire, to transcribe the book into a theatrical script, which was then staged in a new production at The Square Chapel, Halifax.
 In November 2007, the play was produced by Red Kettle in Waterford, Ireland, to positive reviews.
 In 2011, the play was also adapted for Trouble Puppet Theater Co. by artistic director Connor Hopkins at Salvage Vanguard Theater in Austin, Texas. This production employed tabletop puppetry inspired by the Bunraku tradition and was supported by an original score by Justin Sherburn.
 In March 2015, a group of Aberystwyth drama students performed the play in Theatre y Castell over the course of two days. The production was directed by David Ian Rabey.

Popular music 
 "The Rapture of Riddley Walker" is the eighth song on the Clutch album From Beale Street to Oblivion (2007).
 "Widder's Dump", named after a location in the book and notes on the credits as being inspired by the novel, is the fifth song on the 1989  King Swamp album.
 "In the Heart of the Wood and What I Found There" from the album Thunder Perfect Mind by Current 93 features references to Riddley Walker. Another Current 93 song, "The Blue Gates of Death" from the album Earth Covers Earth incorporates a rhyme from the book. Also, their album Of Ruine or Some Blazing Starre cites the Saint Eustace story.
 "Ode to Riddley Walker" is the title track of the second solo album by The Owl Service vocalist Diana Collier (2020). The song refers directly to Hoban's novel.

See also 

 Cloud Atlas
 The Book of Dave
 Engine Summer
 Pilgermann

References

Sources

External links 
 Riddley Walker Annotations
 The Riddley Walker Concordance
 Russell Hoban on Riddley Walker (The Guardian, 26 November 2010)
 Gallery: Quentin Blake illustrations for Russell Hoban's Riddley Walker
 Photographs of Trouble Puppet Theater Co's production

1980 British novels
1980 science fiction novels
British novels adapted into plays
British science fiction novels
British post-apocalyptic novels
John W. Campbell Award for Best Science Fiction Novel-winning works
Books written in fictional dialects
Novels set in Kent
Novels by Russell Hoban
Jonathan Cape books
Future dialects